Bob Maize (January 15, 1945 – November 20, 2004) was an American jazz double bassist born and raised in Ontario California.

Maize played piano from age seven and switched to bass at 13. After moving to San Francisco in 1963, Maize worked in the house bands of many jazz clubs in the city, including Soulville and Bop City. He played with Sonny Stitt, Philly Joe Jones, Vince Guaraldi, Mose Allison, Herb Ellis, Monty Alexander, Anita O'Day, Emily Remler, and Jon Hendricks; he also did a stint in a rock band as a bass guitarist.

He moved to Los Angeles with his family in 1980, where he worked with Concord Jazz All Stars, Scott Hamilton, Dave McKenna, Rosemary Clooney, Mel Tormé and Tal Farlow. Maize also worked with Horace Silver in 1983–84, 1993 (It's Got to Be Funky) and 1995–96. He did a tour of Japan and Europe with Sarah Vaughan in 1985. He continued to play as a sideman in West Coast clubs into the 2000s.

Maize died on November 20, 2004 at Providence St. Joseph Medical Center in Burbank, Los Angeles, after suffering a heart attack at home, according to bassist Putter Smith.  He was survived by two wives & three children.

Discography (as sideman)

References

 Musician credits - Warner LP WS 1775, 1969.
 Musician credits - Concord Jazz LP CJ-217, 1983.

1945 births
2004 deaths
American jazz double-bassists
Male double-bassists
American jazz bass guitarists
20th-century American bass guitarists
American male bass guitarists
20th-century double-bassists
20th-century American male musicians
American male jazz musicians